Isopropyl nitrate (IPN, 2-propyl nitrate) is a colorless liquid monopropellant.  It is used as a diesel cetane improver.  IPN is a low-sensitivity explosive, with a detonation velocity of approximately 5400 m/s.

Isopropyl nitrate is extremely flammable and burns with a practically invisible flame. This presents unique hazards in its handling. The flame is significantly less luminous than hydrogen or methanol flame and is only visible due to the turbulent hot air it generates.

Isopropyl nitrate was previously used in a jet engine rapid starting system for military interceptor aircraft (a requirement for fast scrambling, as it provided simultaneous, near-instantaneous engine starting for twin engines) and was known as AVPIN. The exhaust fumes from an AVPIN monopropellant engine may themselves be explosive, if mixed with further air.

Early systems, as used on the Gloster Javelin, used a simple pressurising cartridge and had a poor reputation for misfires, including engine-destroying explosions. Nevertheless, Rolls-Royce was able to demonstrate that the fuel is extremely stable and that a cannon shell could be fired through a container of it with no dramatic effect. Isopropyl nitrate was also sold by the Turbonique company under the brand name "Thermolene" as a fuel for their line of turbine-powered "drag axles" and superchargers, during the 1960s.

It is officially classed as safe to transport provided it is labelled as flammable. Although engine starters do not require an air supply for their basic operation, air was supplied to later designs, such as that of the English Electric Lightning, by an automatic scavenge pump simply to control these fumes. The history of AVPIN use on the Lightning demonstrated it was both safe and effective in use. The reduced availability of AVPIN is now a restriction on the continued operation of some preserved military aircraft, such as Lightnings in the UK and South Africa and some are thus being converted to electric starting.

It has also been used as a fuel for power supply and actuation in guided weapons, notably in the British Royal Navy.

References

External links 
 EPA Substance registry system

Liquid explosives
Alkyl nitrates
Isopropyl esters
Monopropellants